The Real Convictorio de San Carlos, or Convictorio de San Carlos after independence, was a college in Lima created at the end of the Viceroyalty of Peru and which survived until the first decades of the Peruvian Republic.

It was housed at the Casona de la Universidad Nacional Mayor de San Marcos. A conservative school, it had a longstanding rivalry with the more liberal .

It was established in 1770 by a royal decree of Viceroy Manuel de Amat y Junyent that merged the defunct colleges of San Martín and San Felipe after the expulsion of the Jesuits. It was closed in October 1817, but later reopened after the independence of Peru, in 1822. After its reopening, it worked without issues until 1866, when it became the Faculty of Letters and Human Sciences of the National University of San Marcos.

Notable alumni
Antonio Arenas
Luis Germán Astete
Benjamín Boza
Manuel Candamo
José Gálvez Egúsquiza
Manuel María Gálvez Egúsquiza
Pedro Gálvez Egúsquiza
Aurelio García y García
Manuel González Prada
Manuel Menéndez
Bernardo O'Higgins
José Joaquín de Olmedo
Ricardo Palma
Manuel Pardo y Lavalle
Juan Antonio Pezet
Juan Antonio Ribeyro Estrada
Felipe Santiago Salaverry
José Bernardo de Tagle
Manuel Irigoyen Larrea

See also
National University of San Marcos
Casona of the National University of San Marcos

References

Schools in Lima
Education in Peru
Student houses